Kwanja (Konja) is a Mambiloid language of Cameroon. Njanga (Nyanjang) is a distinct dialect.

References

Mambiloid languages
Languages of Cameroon